WEAF may refer to:

 WEAF (AM), a radio station (1130 AM) in Camden, South Carolina (formerly WAME and WQIS)
 WPTI, a radio station (94.5 FM) in Eden, North Carolina, which held the WEAF call sign from 1968 to 1980
 WQHT, a radio station (97.1 FM) in New York City which was WEAF-FM from 1944 to 1946.
 WFAN (AM), a radio station (660 AM) in New York City which held the WEAF call sign from 1922 to 1946
 West of England Aerospace Forum
 Writers Emergency Assistance Fund
 Wisconsin Equity Association in Funding